The Little Theatre of Alexandria is a community theatre located at 600 Wolfe Street in Alexandria, Virginia. It was founded by Mary Lindsey in 1934 and was originally known as the Peacock Players.  It has since staged more than 350 productions.  During recent years it has produced a seven to ten show season. and is particularly well known for its one-act playwriting competition.  It has played an important role in launching the careers of playwrights such as Sandra Fenichel Asher, Rich Orloff, and Jacob M. Appel.

The theatre has a member/subscriber base of over 2,000 and owns its own building, which was completed in 1961.

References

External links
Little Theatre of Alexandria

Community theatre
Theatres in Virginia
Buildings and structures in Alexandria, Virginia
Tourist attractions in Alexandria, Virginia
1934 establishments in Virginia
Organizations established in 1934